The Bulgarian Association of Music Producers (or BAMP) tracks the success of music compositions on Bulgarian airplay, and it is a non-profit organization that controls music production companies in that country. Founded in 1996, it defends the rights of producers and distributors of popular music. According to their official website, the main focus of their association is: "to assist the competent authorities in organizing and coordinating activities related to the fight against music piracy." In 1999, it gained recognition as a national group of the International Federation of the Phonographic Industry (IFPI), which advocates record companies worldwide. They track charted music both from Bulgarian artists and international acts using Nielson SoundScan.

References

External links
Official website
Archives of their "Airplay Top 5" chart from 2009–2015

1996 establishments in Bulgaria
Organizations established in 1996
Music organizations based in Bulgaria